1997 Gamba Osaka season

Competitions

Domestic results

J.League

Emperor's Cup

J.League Cup

Player statistics

 † player(s) joined the team after the opening of this season.

Transfers

In:

Out:

Transfers during the season

In
Junichi Inamoto (Gamba Osaka youth)
Toshimi Kikuchi (from Verdy Kawasaki)
Yuzo Funakoshi (loan return from Telstar on June)
Toru Araiba (Gamba Osaka youth)
Karić (from Maribor on August)

Out
Kenji Honnami (to Verdy Kawasaki)
Mladen Mladenović (on June)

Awards
J.League Top Scorer: Mboma
J.League Best XI: Mboma

References
J.LEAGUE OFFICIAL GUIDE 1997, 1997 
J.LEAGUE OFFICIAL GUIDE 1998, 1996 
J.LEAGUE YEARBOOK 1999, 1999 
URAWA REDS OFFICIAL HANDBOOK 2003, 2003,

Other pages
 J. League official site
 Gamba Osaka official site

Gamba Osaka
Gamba Osaka seasons